Edward T. Peterson (June 27, 1924 – March 20, 1984) was an American professional basketball player.

A 6'9" center from Cornell University, Peterson played three seasons in the NBL and NBA as a member of the Syracuse Nationals and Tri-Cities Blackhawks.

He was elected into the Sphinx Head Society during his senior year at Cornell University.

Career statistics

NBA

Source

Regular season

Playoffs

References

External links
Career statistics

1924 births
1984 deaths
Basketball players from Syracuse, New York
Centers (basketball)
Cornell Big Red men's basketball players
New York Knicks draft picks
Syracuse Nationals players
Tri-Cities Blackhawks players